Under the Lights  is the fourth album by the rock band Moxy in its second incarnation, released in 1978. With the departure of Buzz Shearman as lead vocalist in 1977 for medical reasons, Mike Reno (then known as Michael Rynoski) was brought for his debut in music. The album produced two minor Canadian hits with the title track "Under the Lights" plus "High School Queen", that gives a preview of the sound that Reno would take with him to his next band Loverboy that saw great success in the 1980s. Album sales were poor for Under the Lights as fans did not take to the new softer sound on the album. After the departure of Earl Johnson in the summer of 1978, Moxy would not record a new album until Bill Wade got Earl Johnson and Buddy Caine back into the studio in 1999 for Moxy V. This album would also have the 3rd line-up change for a lead singer with the addition of Brian Maxim.

In regards to the album itself and the singing of Mike Reno, Earl Johnson stated: "Under The Lights", wasn't even really a Moxy album. Mike Reno has a great voice, but he just wasn't a hard-edged singer". The album was re-released as Thinking About You  (As Mike Reno and Moxy) in 1980.

Personnel

Michael Rynoski: vocals 
Earl Johnson: Guitar
Buddy Caine: Guitar
Terry Juric: Bass
Danny Bilan: drums
Jack Richardson - percussion
Scott Cushnie - Piano
Colina Phillips - Background Vocals 
Tracy Richardson - Background Vocals
Sharon Williams - Background Vocals
Brian Christian - Engineer
Paul Hoffert -Vocal Arrangements
Jack Richardson - Producer

Track listing

  "High School Queen" - 4:53 - (Buddy Caine, Mike Reno)
  "Under the Lights" - 4:09 - (Buddy Caine, Mike Reno)
  "Maybe I'm a Dreamer" - 4:48 - (Earl Johnson, Mike Reno)
  "Sing to Me" - 4:11 - (Earl Johnson, Mike Reno)
  "Sailor's Delight" - 4:57 - (Buddy Caine, Mike Reno)
  "Thinking About You"  - 3:43 - (Buddy Caine, Mike Reno)
  "Easy Come, Easy Go"  - 4:49 - (Mike Reno)
  "Living and Learning" - 3:59 - (Earl Johnson, Mike Reno)

References

External links
 Moxy Official Web Site
Loverboy's site

1978 albums
Moxy (band) albums
Albums produced by Jack Richardson (record producer)
Polydor Records albums